Lee Kyung-chun (born 14 April 1969) is a former South Korean footballer. Lee played for Dawoo Royals, Chonbuk Buffalo, Jeonbuk Hyundai Motors in the K League. He also played as an over-aged player for South Korean under-23 team in the 1996 Summer Olympics.

Honours 
Jeonbuk Hyundai Motors	
Korean FA Cup: 2000

References

External links 
 
  (FIFA player name had mistake)

K League 1 players
Busan IPark players
Chonbuk Buffalo players
Jeonbuk Hyundai Motors players
Ajou University alumni
1969 births
Living people
Association football defenders
South Korean footballers
South Korea international footballers
Olympic footballers of South Korea
Footballers at the 1996 Summer Olympics
Footballers at the 1994 Asian Games
Asian Games competitors for South Korea